"You're Not Sorry" is a song written and recorded by American singer-songwriter Taylor Swift for her second studio album, Fearless. It was released for download via the iTunes Store as a promotional from the album on October 28, 2008, by Big Machine Records. Swift was inspired to write "You're Not Sorry" by an ex-boyfriend who she realized was the contrary to what he had appeared to be. Produced by Swift and Nathan Chapman, "You're Not Sorry" is a rock power ballad with gentle piano in the verses and dramatic electric guitar in the build-up. A remix version for the television episode of CSI: Crime Scene Investigation, in which Swift made an appearance, was later released.

Some critics praised the production of "You're Not Sorry", but others took issue with the balladic production as overdone. The song peaked at number 11 on both the Canadian Hot 100 and the US Billboard Hot 100. In the United States, it was certified platinum by the Recording Industry Association of America (RIAA). On the Fearless Tour (2009–2010), Swift performed a mashup of "You're Not Sorry" and Justin Timberlake's "What Goes Around.../...Comes Around". She included it as part of a mashup with "Back to December" and OneRepublic's "Apologize" on her next tour, the Speak Now World Tour. She also sang the track at the 44th Academy of Country Music Awards in 2009.

Swift released a re-recorded version, "You're Not Sorry (Taylor's Version)", as part of her re-recorded album Fearless (Taylor's Version) (2021). The re-recorded version charted on the Canadian Hot 100 and the Billboard Global 200.

Background
"You're Not Sorry" was written by Swift and produced by Nathan Chapman alongside Swift. It was inspired by an ex-boyfriend who was later revealed to be opposite of what Swift had originally thought. Swift recalled that, at first, "He came across as prince charming." As the relationship continued, Swift was informed of numerous secrets about her boyfriend she was not aware of. "And one by one, I would figure them out. I would find out who he really was," she said. She wrote "You're Not Sorry" in an emotional state, which she described as "the breaking point", where she thought to herself, "'You know what? Don’t even think that you can keep on hurting me.'" The circumstances reached a point where she felt she had to walk away. "You're Not Sorry" was first released as a promotional single from Fearless on October 28, 2008, as part of Countdown to Fearless, an exclusive campaign by the iTunes Store. The song was reissued on March 5, 2009, as remix, the same day she made her guest appearance on the television series CSI: Crime Scene Investigation in the episode "Turn, Turn, Turn". The remix was featured in the episode.

A re-recorded version of "You're Not Sorry", titled "You're Not Sorry (Taylor's Version)", was released on April 9, 2021, as the ninth track from Fearless (Taylor's Version), the re-recorded version of Fearless. The re-recording was part of Swift's move after a public dispute with Big Machine and talent manager Scooter Braun over the acquisition of the master recordings to her past albums.

Composition

"You're Not Sorry" is four minutes and 21 seconds long. Critics described it as a power ballad with minimal influences of country, contrary to Swift's self-identity as a country musician at the time. Jordan Levin of The Miami Herald characterized the song as a "rebellious rock tune". Anna Rosales from the Evansville Courier & Press thought the track has a "hard rock edge" to it. The song is set in common time and has a slow tempo of 67.5 beats per minute. It is written in the key of E♭ minor and Swift's vocals span two octaves, from G♭3 to C♭5. It follows the chord progression E♭m–C♭–G♭–D♭.

The musical arrangement contains a prominent pop hook in its refrains, according to Jonathan Keefe of Slant Magazine. Rob Sheffield in Rolling Stone described the track as a "dramatic piano-and-strings ballad". "You're Not Sorry" features a soft piano introduction, and in the refrains progresses with dynamic, loud electric guitars, which eventually reach a solo. The production additionally incorporates cello and strings. Scott Mervis of the Pittsburgh Post-Gazette compared "You're Not Sorry" to a "chanteuse a la Tori Amos". In the lyrics, the protagonist criticizes an ex-lover who betrayed her trust. Sheffield, in a review for Blender, noted the lyrics to "You're Not Sorry" had many "tingling pheromones". Kyle Anderson from MTV said that the theme of "You're Not Sorry" is more serious than the "dreaminess" of the previous upbeat Fearless tracks: "the weight of the lyrics actually weighs down the arrangement (it literally sounds like it's being played just a hair too slow, which creates a palpable tension)."

The re-recorded "You're Not Sorry (Taylor's Version)" features an identical production, but critics also commented that Swift's vocals became richer and deeper. Joe Coscarelli opined that the production of the re-recording sounded "fresh and refined", an improvement from the original. Music professor Michael A. Lee observed that on "You're Not Sorry (Taylor's Version)", Swift's vocals are less nasal and come more from the chest, the background vocals are more subdued, and the strings are recorded in a closer proximity to the microphones.

Critical reception
Music critics gave "You're Not Sorry" mixed reviews. Sheffield in Blender described the track as "drippy" and opined that it is not as effective as other upbeat Fearless tracks. Todd Martens from the Los Angeles Times deemed Swift's vocals weak. Nick Catucci of New York commented that "You're Not Sorry" contrasts with Swift's identity as a country-music artist because the track "isn't the stuff of redneck women but earnest suburban princesses". Catucci said that although he could come up with better songs by other singer-songwriters in the last ten years, "this bittersweet bit of pop fluff succeeds splendidly. She's an American idol, on her own terms." Jonathan Keefe of Slant Magazine was more favorable, remarking that the production of "You're Not Sorry" showcases Swift's songwriting with a prominent hook. Craig Rosen of The Hollywood Reporter said the song proved Swift's crossover potential beyond country music.

Retrospectively, critics have considered "You're Not Sorry" one of Swift's weaker songs in her catalog. Hannah Mylrea in NME (2020) ranked it 146th out of 161 songs in Swift's discography, calling it "overdone". Nate Jones from Vulture ranked it 122nd in a ranking of Swift's 179 tracks, describing it as an "unflinching kiss-off song". In Rolling Stone, Sheffield placed it at number 111 in his 2021 ranking of Swift's 206-song catalog, highlighting the track for showcasing her vocal development from her debut album. Brittany Spanos from the same magazine praised Swift's singing for conveying the dramatic sentiments: "Her voice pierces through the sound of her band for one of her first truly dramatic vocal deliveries." Joe Coscarelli from The New York Times said he had admired Swift's songwriting "You're Not Sorry" but felt the production "[plods] a little"; after the re-recorded version was released, Coscarelli became more appreciative of the track.

Chart performance
"You're Not Sorry" debuted and peaked at number 11 on the Billboard Hot 100 chart in November 2008, becoming the week's highest debut. After being featured in the CSI series, supported by the remix, "You're Not Sorry" re-entered the Billboard Hot 100 at number 67. It is one of the 13 Fearless tracks that charted within the top 40 of the Billboard Hot 100, breaking the record for the most top 40 entries from a single album. It spent a total of five weeks on the Hot 100. On the Pop 100 chart compiled by Billboard, the track peaked at number 21. By December 2011, "You're Not Sorry" had sold 653,000 copies in the United States. In 2017, the song was certified platinum by the Recording Industry Association of America (RIAA) for surpassing one million units based on sales and streaming. In Canada, it peaked at number 11 on the Canadian Hot 100.

Live performances

Swift performed "You're Not Sorry" on all venues of her first headlining concert tour, the Fearless Tour, which extended from April 2009 to June 2010. During each performance, Swift donned a black cocktail dress with sparkly ornaments along the stomach. She began the performance by sitting on a bench, playing  black grand piano. Midway through "You're Not Sorry", Swift ceases playing the piano and commences to sing a cover version of Justin Timberlake's "What Goes Around.../...Comes Around" while whipping her hair, maintaining on the bench. Throughout the remainder of the performance, she intermingled between the two songs as smoke swirled and lightning was projected on the stage. Jon Pareles of The New York Times referred to the performance as one of the night's highlights at the August 27, 2009, concert at Madison Square Garden in New York City. Reed Fischer of Miami New Times attended the March 7, 2010, concert at BankAtlantic Center in Sunrise, Florida and, of the cover of "What Goes Around.../...Comes Around", said, "That, and some extended beating on an oil drum sculpture, made for the only unsavory moments of the night." Alice Fisher of the United Kingdom magazine The Observer believed the performance at the May 7, 2009, concert at Shepherd's Bush Empire in London, England "was undermined by the way Swift writhed on her stool and awkwardly thumped the piano lid in one of the most unconvincing displays of passion I've seen since Footballers' Wives finished." Swift also performed the song at an exclusive performance, hosted by 95.8 Capital FM, the 2009 Academy of Country Music Awards, and the 2009 CMA Music Festival. During her Speak Now World Tour, she used elements of "You're Not Sorry" and "Apologize" while performing "Back To December". She also performed the song three times during the Red Tour.

Charts

"You're Not Sorry"

"You're Not Sorry (Taylor's Version)"

Certifications

References

2000s ballads
2008 songs
Songs written by Taylor Swift
Taylor Swift songs
Song recordings produced by Taylor Swift
Song recordings produced by Nathan Chapman (record producer)
Song recordings produced by Chris Rowe
Big Machine Records singles
Rock ballads